Beta-defensin 105 is a protein that is encoded by the DEFB105A gene in humans.

Defensins form a family of microbicidal and cytotoxic peptides made by neutrophils. Defensins are short, processed peptide molecules that are classified by structure into three groups: Alpha defensins, Beta defensins and Theta defensins. All beta-defensin genes are densely clustered in four to five syntenic chromosomal regions. Chromosome 8p23 contains at least two copies of the duplicated beta-defensin cluster. This duplication results in two identical copies of defensin, beta 105, DEFB105A and DEFB105B, in tail-to-tail orientation. This gene, DEFB105A, represents the more centromeric copy.

References

Further reading

Defensins